The Doli Pivski massacre was the mass killing of 522 Serb civilians by the 7th SS Volunteer Mountain Division Prinz Eugen, along with Croatian Ustaše and the SS Handschar Division on 7 June 1943 in the village of Doli Plivski, Montenegro, near the border of Bosnia and Herzegovina during World War II.

The massacre occurred during a joint attack by Axis forces against Yugoslav Partisans codenamed Operation Schwartz. Inhabitants of the Bosnian and Serbian villages of Dub, Bukovac, Miljkovac, Duba and Rudinci, and in the Piva area of Montenegro were captured and taken to the village of Doli Plivski where they were shot and killed or burned alive in houses. 109 of the victims were children. Entire families were anhilated. According to the Montenegrin newspaper Vijesti, children were killed first so that the elderly could watch the death of the youngest. In one sinkhole, 107 children and a mother who was giving birth at that time were killed within in a minute.

In 1977, the Yugoslav government built a memorial site in Doli Pivski. An Orthodox church was constructed in 2004. In 2017, the Serbian Orthodox Church proclaimed the victims of the massacre as martyrs. A girl who ran into a burning house in order to die alongside her family was given the title of "Holy Martyr Jaglika Pivska".

References

External links
 Whose memory? The Commemorative Site of Nazi Massacre in the Piva Region in 1943 at the Charles University, Faculty of Social Sciences

Massacres in Yugoslavia
1943 in Montenegro
Mass murder in 1943
1943 in Yugoslavia
Massacres in 1943
Yugoslavia in World War II
June 1943 events
Massacres of Serbs